Gary Sanchez Productions was an American film and television production company founded by Will Ferrell and Adam McKay.

History
Gary Sanchez Productions was founded in 2006 by comedians and filmmakers Will Ferrell and Adam McKay. The company is named after a fictional "Paraguayan entrepreneur and financier", Gary Sanchez. In 2007, McKay and Ferrell also founded the video site Funny or Die, under the ownership of the production company.

In August 2018, the company entered a three-year first look feature deal with Paramount Pictures.

On April 8, 2019, it was announced that Ferrell and McKay would be dissolving their partnership, and that all developed projects at that time would continue to be completed. In October 2019, McKay founded Hyperobject Industries. In January 2020, it was announced that Ferrell opened the doors of Gloria Sanchez Productions, taking on new projects with a reorganized company.

The company will continue to exist by name to release further remaining films that are in development.

Filmography

Film

Television

References

External links
 Official Website (Archive)
 Gary Sanchez Productions at the Internet Movie Database

 

Film production companies of the United States
Mass media companies established in 2006
Mass media companies disestablished in 2019
Television production companies of the United States
Will Ferrell